Jukjeon-dong is a dong in Suji-gu of Yongin city. Jukjeon was divided into Jukjeon 1-dong and Jukjeon 2-dong on December 24, 2001, when Suji-eup was promoted into Suji-gu. Jukjeon borders Seongnam city to the north, Mohyeon-Eup of Cheoin-gu to the east, and Giheung-gu to the south. Tancheon flows through the neighborhood, with west of the stream classified as Jukjeon 1-dong and the east of it classified as Jukjeon 2-dong. Jeongpyeongcheon, a stream, also flows into Tancheon at Jukjeon. Along the banks of Tancheon are small parks and paths for walkers and cyclists.

Apartments overwhelmingly outnumber individual houses in number as a result of relatively little urban planning compared to Bundang or Pangyo, Seongnam. There are a few luxury townhouse complexes located in the Greater Jukjeon Area (죽전지구), but they actually belong to Bojeong-dong of Giheung-gu.

The main campus Dankook University is located in Jukjeon. As a result, Jukjeon Station is also called Dankook University Station.

Shopping 

The Gyeonggi Branch (경기점) of Shinsegae Department Store is located in Jukjeon. It houses CGV, a movie theater chain, and is attached to E-Mart Jukjeon Branch and Bundang Line's Jukjeon Station.

About 250 stores in Jukjeon Fashion Town attract people from all over Korea and even tourists from China or Taiwan. It began forming just before the 1997 Asian Financial Crisis and now houses seven separate districts within itself. it is located along Seongnam-daero from Ori Station to Jukjeon intersection.

Education

Elementary School 
 Daedeok Elementary School
 Daeil Elementary School
 Daeji Elementary School
 Hyeongam Elementary School
 Daecheong Elementary School
 Daehyeon Elementary School
 Sinchon Elementary School
 Jukjeon Elementary School

Middle School 
 Yongin Daedeok Middle School
 Daedeok Middle School
 Yongin Jukjeon Middle School
 Hyeongam Middle School

High Schools 
 Jukjeon High School
 Daeji High School
 Hyeonam High School

Universities 
 Dankook University (Main campus)

Transportation

Subway 
 Bundang Line - Jukjeon Station (Also called : Dankook University Station)

Buses 
 Dosihyeong, (도시형, city type buses)
 ● 27
 ● 27-5
 ● 60
 ● 67
 ● 67-1
 ● 68
 ● 101
 ● 116
 ● 116-1
 ● 116-3
 ● 390
 ● 660
 ● 690
 ● 720-2
 ● 720-3
 ● 820
 ● 1116

 Jwaseok (좌석, express buses)
 ● 102
 ● 1005-1
 ● 1005-2
 ● 1303
 ● 1500-3
 ● 2002-1
 ● 2003
 ● 5500-1
 ● 7007-1
 ● 8100
 ● 8101
 ● 8251
 ● 9001
 ● 9404
 ● 9409
 ● 9414

Sub-divisions 
1-dong on the west side of Tancheon and 2-dong on the east side of Tancheon

References 

Yongin
Neighbourhoods in South Korea